Let the People Sing is a 1942 British comedy film directed by John Baxter, and starring Alastair Sim, Fred Emney and Edward Rigby. The film's sets were designed by R. Holmes Paul. It was made at Elstree Studios.

The screenplay concerns a small town that bands together to try to save their music hall from closure. It was based on the 1939 novel Let the People Sing by J. B. Priestley.

Main cast

Critical reception
Time Out wrote "John Baxter was the British director probably least patronizing and most sympathetic to the working classes and their culture during the '30s and '40s, and even if his films now often seem naïve and simplistic, it's good at least to see an honest and humorous attempt to deal with life outside Mayfair. Less scathing than Love on the Dole (his best known film), this adaptation of a JB Priestley novel is a spritely, vaguely Capra-esque comedy... Fred Emney steals the show as a government arbitrator susceptible to the charms of alcohol."

References

Bibliography
 Murphy, Robert. Realism and Tinsel: Cinema and Society in Britain, 1939-48. Routledge, 1992.

External links

 https://free-classic-movies.com/movies-04/04-1942-08-10-Let-the-People-Sing/index.php

1942 films
1942 comedy films
1940s English-language films
Films directed by John Baxter
British comedy films
Films set in England
Films shot at British National Studios
Films based on British novels
British black-and-white films
1940s British films